Alessandro Bordin (born 1 August 1998) is an Italian professional footballer who plays as a midfielder for  club Latina.

Club career

Roma 
Born in Latina, Bordin was a youth exponent of Roma.

Loan to Ternana 
On 6 July 2017, Bordin was loaned to Serie B club Ternana with an option to buy. On 16 September, Bordin made his Serie B debut for Ternana as a substitute replacing Andrea Paolucci in the 28th minute of a 3–1 away defeat against Virtus Entella. Four weeks later, on 14 October, he played his first entire match for the club, a 4–2 home win over Spezia. Bordin ended his season-long loan to Ternana with only 6 appearances, including 5 as a starter and playing 2 entire matches, remaining an unused substitute for 35 times during the season between Serie B and Coppa Italia, however Ternana was relegated in Serie C.

Loan to Perugia 
On 17 August 2018, Bordin was signed by Serie B side Perugia on a season-long loan deal. On 30 September he made his debut for Perugia in Serie B as a substitute replacing Raffaele Bianco in the 83rd minute of a 1–1 away draw against Cosenza. On 2 December he played his first match as a starter for Perugia, a 2–1 home win over Pescara, he was replaced by Pasquale Mazzocchi after 81 minutes. Six days later, on 8 December, he played his first entire match, a 0–0 away draw against Lecce. Bordin ended his loan to Perugia with only 5 appearances, including 4 as a starter, remaining an used substitute for 24 matches.

Spezia
On 31 July 2019, Bordin signed to Serie B club Spezia.

Loan to Pistoiese 
On the same day he was loaned to Serie C club Pistoiese on loan for the entire 2019–20 season. Four weeks later, on 25 August, Bordin made his Serie C debut for Pistoiese in a 2–1 home defeat against AlbinoLeffe, he played the entire match. He became Pistoiese's first-choice early in the season. On 7 December, he was sent-off, for the first time in his career, with a double yellow card in the 84th minute of a 0–0 away draw against Pro Vercelli. Bordin ended his season-long loan to Pistoiese with 19 appearances, including 15 of them as a starter, and making 1 assist.

Loan to Casertana 
On 23 September 2020, Bordin was signed by Serie C side Casertana on a season-long loan deal. Two weeks later, on 7 October, he made his dubut for the club in a 2–2 away draw against Potenza, he played the entire match.

Fidelis Andria
On 30 August 2021, he signed with Fidelis Andria. In January 2022 he left the club by mutual consensus.

Latina
On 9 August 2022, Bordin joined his hometown club Latina on a one-year deal.

International career 
Bordin represented Italy at Under-16, Under-17, Under-18, Under-19 and Under-20 level. On 11 March 2013 he made his U-16 debut in a 2–1 away win over Croatia U-16, he played the entire match. On 10 October 2014 he made his U-17 debut in a 0–0 away draw against Israel U-17. Bordin with Italy U-17 played also a match as a substitute in the 2014 UEFA European Under-17 Championship qualifying round against Moldavia U-17. On 12 August 2015, Bordin made his debut with Italy U-18 in a 0–0 home draw against Bulgaria U-18, he was replaced by Fabio Castellano in the 57th minute. Two months later, on 12 October he scored his first international goal in the 30th minute of a 2–1 home defeat against Poland U-18. One more month later he played his first entire match, a 2–0 away defeat against Austria U-18. On 11 September 2016, Bordin made his U-19 debut as a substitute replacing Edoardo Degl'Innocenti in the 54th minute of a 1–0 home defeat against Croatia U-19. On 27 March 2018 he made his U-20 debut as a substitute replacing Giulio Maggiore in the 72nd minute of a 3–2 home defeat against Switzerland U-19 in the 2017–18 Under 20 Elite League. One month later, on 25 April he scored his first goal at U-20 level in the 23rd minute of a 3–0 home win over Croatia U-20.

Career statistics

Club

Honours

Club 
Roma Primavera

 Campionato Nazionale Primavera: 2015–16
 Coppa Italia Primavera: 2016–17
 Supercoppa Primavera: 2017

References

External links
 

1998 births
Living people
People from Latina, Lazio
Sportspeople from the Province of Latina
Footballers from Lazio
Italian footballers
Association football midfielders
Serie B players
Serie C players
A.S. Roma players
Ternana Calcio players
A.C. Perugia Calcio players
Spezia Calcio players
U.S. Pistoiese 1921 players
Casertana F.C. players
S.S. Fidelis Andria 1928 players
Latina Calcio 1932 players
Italy youth international footballers